Kim Ho-yeong (born 26 April 1997) is a South Korean footballer currently playing as a defender for Kamatamare Sanuki.

Club statistics
.

Notes

References

External links

1997 births
Living people
South Korean footballers
South Korean expatriate footballers
Association football defenders
Yeungnam University alumni
Kim Ho-yeong
Kim Ho-yeong
Kamatamare Sanuki players
South Korean expatriate sportspeople in Thailand
Expatriate footballers in Thailand
South Korean expatriate sportspeople in Japan
Expatriate footballers in Japan
People from Ansan
Sportspeople from Gyeonggi Province